At the 1964 Summer Olympics in Tokyo, eight events in fencing were contested.  Men competed in both individual and team events for each of the three weapon types (épée, foil and sabre), but women competed only in foil events.

Medal summary

Men's events

Women's events

Medal table

Participating nations
A total of 259 fencers (203 men and 56 women) from 30 nations competed at the Tokyo Games:

References

Sources

 

 
1964 Summer Olympics events
1964
1964 in fencing
International fencing competitions hosted by Japan